100th Window is the fourth studio album by English electronic music group Massive Attack, released on 10 February 2003 by Virgin Records. The album was mainly produced by lead member Robert Del Naja, as the group's producer Andrew Vowles departed shortly after the release of their previous album Mezzanine (1998), and Grant Marshall opted out of the production of the album. 100th Window features vocals from regular guest Horace Andy, as well as newcomers Sinéad O'Connor and Damon Albarn (performing as 2D from Gorillaz). Stylistically, it is the first album by the group to make no use of existing samples, and contains none of the hip hop or jazz fusion styles that the group were initially known for.

Background
Del Naja initially conceived of 100th Window in its untitled form in early 2000 at the Christchurch Studios in Clifton, Bristol, recruiting Lupine Howl, a band made up of ex-members of Spiritualized, for the new project. In a November 2001 interview, Lupine Howl's lead singer Sean Cook described the sessions as "very experimental [...] minimal loops and noises that were fed to our headphones from the computer up in the control room. Then we would have this sort of extended jam session playing along to them and they would do various things to do the loops." Del Naja and Davidge also maintained a strobe light in their studio while the band jammed, dictating the intensity of their performances with the lighting. However, in a post to Massive Attack's forums in July 2002, Del Naja subsequently announced that the band had become "very unhappy with the shapes being formed", and that by the beginning of 2002 they had discarded most of the material that was written up to that point; the September 11 attacks also motivated him to depart from the original tone of the album.

Reception

Initial critical response to 100th Window was positive. At Metacritic, which assigns a normalised rating out of 100 to reviews from mainstream critics, the album has received an average score of 75, based on 25 reviews.

As of February 2010, the album had sold 180,000 copies in the United States, according to Nielsen SoundScan.

Track listing

Notes
 Track 7 features backing vocals by the character 2-D, performed by Damon Albarn.
 On track 9, "Antistar" ends at 8:17. At 8:47, an untitled instrumental track, commonly referred to as "LP4", plays.

Personnel
Credits adapted from the liner notes of 100th Window.

Musicians

 Alex Swift – additional programming, keyboards
 Sinéad O'Connor – vocals
 Horace Andy – vocals
 Robert Del Naja – vocals, string arrangement
 Angelo Bruschini – guitar
 Damon Reece – drums
 Jon Harris – bass
 Stuart Gordon – violin
 Skaila Kanga – harp
 Craig Pruess – string arrangement, conducting
 Neil Davidge – string arrangement
 Gavyn Wright – orchestra leader
 2-D – backing vocals on "Small Time Shot Away"

Technical

 Robert Del Naja – production
 Neil Davidge – production
 Alex Swift – additional programming, keyboards
 Lee Shephard – recording, engineering
 Mark "Spike" Stent – mixing
 Paul "P Dub" Walton – mixing assistance
 David Treahearn – mixing assistance
 Robert Haggett – mixing assistance
 Tim Young – mastering
 Mike Ross – recording

Artwork
 Robert Del Naja – art direction, design
 Tom Hingston – art direction, design
 Nick Knight – photography

Charts

Weekly charts

Year-end charts

Certifications and sales

Notes

References

2003 albums
Albums produced by Neil Davidge
Ambient dub albums
Massive Attack albums
Minimal techno albums
Virgin Records albums